The Racquet Club was a resort in Palm Springs, California, founded by actors Charles Farrell and Ralph Bellamy, which opened on December 15, 1934. Originally developed with two tennis courts, it expanded to include a swimming pool, the "Bamboo Room" bar, bungalows, and more courts. Julie Copeland was the very longtime Hostess of the Club. Frank Bogert (later two-time Mayor of Palm Springs) was an early Manager of the Club. Champion players such as Arthur Ashe, Jimmy Connors, Roy Emerson, Chris Evert, Pancho Gonzales, Billie Jean King, Jack Kramer, Rod Laver, Bob Lutz, Gene Mako, Alice Marble, Charlie Pasarell, Bobby Riggs, Ken Rosewall,  Pancho Segura, Stan Smith, Roscoe Tanner, Mike Franks, and Ellsworth Vines all played at the club. The club also served as a gathering place and party venue for much of Hollywood's show business elite. The club was the venue for the 1975 Davis Cup Americas Zone, but it then suffered a decline. After a massive fire on July 23, 2014, it was totally demolished.

The Racquet Club in popular media
The Jack Benny Program (also broadcast as The Jack Benny Show), a 1932–1965 radio and TV series, featured a radio episode titled "Murder at the Racquet Club" on March 9, 1941.

The Star Studded Ride, a 1954 short film, featured stars Gussie Moran and Dave Gillam at the Racquet Club.

Pin-up photographer Bruno Bernard is credited with first photographing Marilyn Monroe at the Racquet Club in 1947; and it was at the club pool where she met talent agent Johnny Hyde.

References

Tennis venues in California
Athletics clubs in the United States
Defunct companies based in California
Defunct sports clubs in the United States
Defunct sports venues in California
1934 establishments in California